Gus Edwards may refer to:
 Gus Edwards (American football) (born 1995), American football running back
 Gus Edwards (vaudeville) (1878–1945), American songwriter and vaudevillian

See also 
 Harold Edwards (RCAF officer), informally known as "Gus Edwards"